Ryan Alexander Hezekiah Adeleye (born April 28, 1987, in Elizabeth, New Jersey) is an American-Israeli professional soccer player who currently plays for Atlantic City FC in the National Premier Soccer League.

Biography

Early life 
Adeleye was born to Manny Adeleye and Lori Herzig, and is Jewish. His father is a Nigerian who converted to Judaism, while his mother is a Jew from Connecticut. Adeleye attended high school at Newark Academy, where he received all-state, all-conference, all-prep and all-county honors in soccer.

College 
Adeleye attended Davidson College from 2005 to 2006. Afterwards, he transferred to the University of North Carolina where he was a member of the North Carolina Tar Heels men's soccer team. Adeleye's goal for the Tar Heels in a 2007 match against Duke earned him ACC player of the week. After college, Adeleye entered the 2009 MLS SuperDraft where he went undrafted. That same summer, Adeleye was named to the US men's squad for the 2009 Maccabiah Games in Israel.

Israel 
As part of the US Maccabiah team, Adeleye featured in a friendly match against Israeli Premier League side Hapoel Be'er Sheva. Adeleye managed to impress manager Guy Azouri and joined Be'er Sheva on trial at the conclusion of the men's tournament along with teammate Daniel Schultz.

After being signed, Adeleye counted as a foreigner for the club as they awaited his naturalization via the Law of Return. Adeleye made his professional debut for Be'er Sheva in a Toto Cup match against Hapoel Petah Tikva on August 18, 2009. The result was a 1–0 loss.

During a training session in October 2009, Adeleye collapsed, causing panic within the club. He returned to regular training a week later with the permission of the medical staff. The event was scary for Be'er Sheva as it was a tough reminder of former player Chaswe Nsofwa, who died during a training match. About a month later, on December 5, 2009, Adeleye made his league debut, coming on for Shimon Harush in the 86th minute in a 2–0 victory over Hapoel Petah Tikva.

Career statistics

See also
List of select Jewish football (association; soccer) players

Footnotes

External links 

 
 

1987 births
Israeli Jews
Living people
Israeli footballers
Sportspeople from Elizabeth, New Jersey
Jewish American sportspeople
Jewish footballers
Newark Academy alumni
Association football defenders
Soccer players from New Jersey
North Carolina Tar Heels men's soccer players
North Carolina Fusion U23 players
USL League Two players
Jersey Express S.C. players
Maccabiah Games competitors for the United States
Maccabiah Games footballers
Competitors at the 2009 Maccabiah Games
Hapoel Be'er Sheva F.C. players
Hapoel Ashkelon F.C. players
Israeli Premier League players
Liga Leumit players
American expatriate soccer players
American emigrants to Israel
Davidson Wildcats men's soccer players
Fort Lauderdale Strikers players
North American Soccer League players
Hapoel Jerusalem F.C. players
Pittsburgh Riverhounds SC players
USL Championship players
Davidson College alumni
American sportspeople of Nigerian descent
Israeli people of Nigerian descent
American soccer players
African-American soccer players
American people of Yoruba descent
Israeli people of Yoruba descent
Yoruba sportspeople
21st-century African-American sportspeople
21st-century American Jews
20th-century African-American people